In mathematics, the Bateman function (or k-function)  is a special case of the confluent hypergeometric function studied by Harry Bateman(1931).  Bateman defined it by

Bateman discovered this function, when Theodore von Kármán asked for the solution of the following differential equation which appeared in the theory of turbulence

and Bateman found this function as one of the solutions. Bateman denoted this function as "k" function in honor of Theodore von Kármán.

This is not to be confused with another function of the same name which is used in Pharmacokinetics.

Properties

 for  if  is a positive integer
, where  is the Modified Bessel function of the second kind.

References

Special hypergeometric functions
Special functions